Yevgeni Safonov (born 6 July 1977 in Toshkent) is a former Uzbekistani professional football goalkeeper.

He is a member of the national team, and has played 26 matches since his debut in 1999.

Safonov is 1.99 m (6 ft 6 in) tall and weighs 96 kg (15 st 1 lb).

References

External links

1977 births
Living people
Uzbekistani footballers
Uzbekistan international footballers
2004 AFC Asian Cup players
FC Shinnik Yaroslavl players
Russian Premier League players
Uzbekistani expatriate footballers
Expatriate footballers in Russia
Expatriate footballers in Kazakhstan
FC Ural Yekaterinburg players
Uzbekistani expatriate sportspeople in Russia
Uzbekistani expatriate sportspeople in Kazakhstan
FK Dinamo Samarqand players
Uzbekistani people of Russian descent
Association football goalkeepers
FC Megasport players